Mylargadda is a residential suburb of Secunderabad, India.

It is predominantly a middle-class neighbourhood and is half kilometer away from the Secunderabad Station.

Transport
Mylargadda is well connected by TSRTC buses to all parts of the city.

The closest MMTS Train station is at Sitaphalmandi.

Schools
There are many schools for all budgets, more so for middle-class people.

The neighbourhoods surrounding are Chilkalguda, Padmarao Nagar, Sitaphalmandi, Namalagundu.

Neighbourhoods in Hyderabad, India